Elovitsa may refer to:

 In Bulgaria (written in Cyrillic as Еловица):
 Elovitsa, Montana Province - a village in Georgi Damyanovo Municipality, Montana Province
 Elovitsa, Pernik Province - a village in Tran Municipality, Pernik Province